John Fenton Langford (born February 18, 1944) was a Canadian politician who served in the Legislative Assembly of Saskatchewan from 1991 to 1995, as a NDP member for the constituency of Shellbrook-Torch River.

References

Saskatchewan New Democratic Party MLAs
1944 births
Living people
20th-century Canadian politicians
21st-century Canadian politicians